The 8th PGA Golden Laurel Awards, honoring the best film and television producers of 1996, were held at Universal Hilton Hotel in Hollywood, California on March 12, 1997. The motion picture nominees were announced on January 22, 1997, and the television nominees on February 20, 1997.

Winners and nominees

Film

Television

Special

PGA Hall of Fame

References

 1996
1996 film awards
1996 television awards